Roszkowa Wola  is a village in the administrative district of Gmina Rzeczyca, within Tomaszów Mazowiecki County, Łódź Voivodeship, in central Poland.

References

External links
 Map of Roszkowa Wola, Poland (from nona.net) 

Roszkowa Wola